Commonwealth Charter Academy (previously named Commonwealth Connections Academy) is a large, public, cyber charter school. The school serves all school-aged children in the Commonwealth of Pennsylvania regardless of where the child lives. The Academy's headquarters is located in Harrisburg, Pennsylvania. It is one of sixteen public cyber charters schools operating in the Commonwealth of Pennsylvania. The School operates seven additional branches, called Family Service Centers, across the Commonwealth: Andreas, Bryn Mawr, Harrisburg, Center City Philadelphia,  Pittsburgh, Scranton and Williamsport. When the School was originally approved it served Kindergarten through 8th grade pupils all across Pennsylvania.

In 2017, enrollment was 9,300 pupils in grades kindergarten through 12th.
The Capital Area Intermediate Unit IU15 provides the school with a wide variety of services like specialized education for disabled students and hearing, speech and visual disability services and professional development for staff and faculty.

The School offers several specialty programs, including Science and Technology Academy,  Sports Academy and Visual and Performing Arts Academy. These programs give students scheduling and course work flexibility that allows them to pursue their gifts and talents.

References

Education in Harrisburg, Pennsylvania
Susquehanna Valley
Public high schools in Pennsylvania
Charter schools in Pennsylvania
Public middle schools in Pennsylvania
Public elementary schools in Pennsylvania
Educational institutions established in 2003
2003 establishments in Pennsylvania